Nevropoli Agrafon is a former municipality in the Karditsa regional unit, Thessaly, Greece. Since the 2011 local government reform it is part of the municipality Lake Plastiras, of which it is a municipal unit. The municipal unit has an area of 105.184 km2. Population 2,223 (2011). The seat of the municipality was in Pezoula.

References

Populated places in Karditsa (regional unit)

el:Δήμος Λίμνης Πλαστήρα#Νεβρόπολης